Luxemburger Wort is a German-language Luxembourgish daily newspaper. There is an English edition named the Luxembourg Times.

History and profile
Luxemburger Wort has been published since 1848. The paper was founded just three days after press censorship was abolished. The newspaper is mainly written in German, but includes small sections in both Luxembourgish and French. The paper is part of the Saint-Paul Luxembourg S.A. The paper is owned by the archbishopric and has a strong Catholic leaning.

From its very foundation, the newspaper opposed the Volksfreund, founded by Samuel Hirsch, and the Judenrabbiner, as well as the subsidy for the Jewish congregation. In the period from 1849 to 1880, on average it published two anti-Semitic articles per week.

From 1938, the newspaper opposed Nazi Germany. In 1940, after the German invasion of Luxembourg, the Luxemburger Wort was co-opted as part of the occupation. The director Jean Origer and the editors Batty Esch and Pierre Grégoire were arrested by the Nazis and sent to a concentration camp. Pierre Grégoire was the only one of them to survive imprisonment. After the liberation of Luxembourg, the paper produced the headline: Lëtzebuerg as fräi! ("Luxembourg is free!"). At the same time this was one of few editions that appeared entirely in Luxembourgish; the publishing house also changed its name from German into French as a symbolic act.

After André Heiderscheid's replacement as editor-in-chief by Leon Zeches, the latter sought to 'de-ideologise' the newspaper and to distance it more strongly from the Christian Social People's Party. For example, the paper increasingly started to report on initiatives, debates and congresses of other political parties as well.

From 17 March 2005 to 21 March 2008, the paper called itself d' Wort: Luxemburger Wort für Wahrheit und Recht.

In the period of 1995–1996 Luxemburger Wort had a circulation of 85,000 copies, making it the best-selling paper in the country. The circulation of the paper was 83,739 copies in 2003. In 2006 its circulation was 79,633 copies. The paper had a circulation of almost 70,000 copies a day and a daily readership of more than 180,000 (print and e-paper) in 2007, making it Luxembourg's most popular newspaper by both counts.

Editors 
 Edouard Michelis (1848–1854)
 Nicolas Breisdorff (1854–1885)
 Jean-Baptiste Fallize (1884–1887)
 Andreas Welter (1887–1889)
 Jean Origer (1924–1940)
 German occupation 1940–1944
 Jean Bernard (1945–1958)
 Alphonse Turpel (1958–1967)
 André Heiderscheid (1967–1986)
 Léon Zeches (1986–2009)
 Marc Glesener (2010–2012)
 Jean-Lou Siweck (2013–)

Footnotes

External links

  
  
  

1848 establishments in Luxembourg
German-language newspapers published in Luxembourg
Daily newspapers published in Luxembourg
Publications established in 1848
Luxembourgian news websites